Michael Lee Cubbage (born July 21, 1950) is an American former third baseman, coach and manager in Major League Baseball (MLB).

Early life
Born in Charlottesville, Virginia, Cubbage was the son of Lindy and Marge Cubbage and came from a baseball family, as his cousins Larry Haney and Chris Haney played in the major leagues. Cubbage attended University of Virginia, where he played for the Virginia Cavaliers baseball and football teams.

Playing career
Cubbage originally was selected by the expansion Washington Senators in the fifth round of the 1968 MLB draft, but did not sign. He then was drafted again by Washington in the second round of the 1971 entry draft, and spent parts of four seasons in the minor leagues before joining the Texas Rangers on April 7, 1974, in a game against the Oakland Athletics. While appearing in nine games with the Rangers in 1974, he did not collect his first major league hit until being called up in 1975, in a game on June 20 against the California Angels, when he went 3-for-5 with four RBIs.

Cubbage was traded to the Minnesota Twins in 1976. On July 27, 1978, he hit for the cycle against the Toronto Blue Jays. Those that attended the game or watched on television called it an "accidental cycle". In the bottom of the 2nd inning, Cubbage hit a 1-0 pitch to right field, and was thrown out at third trying to leg out a triple; he was therefore credited for a double on the play. He subsequently hit a home run (4th inning), single (5th inning), and triple (7th inning) to complete the cycle.

Cubbage later signed as a free agent with the New York Mets for the 1981 season. Throughout his playing career, he was considered somewhat of a utility player, playing mostly third base, but with stints at the first and second bases and designated hitter positions. Although he spent most of his playing time at shortstop in high school, Cubbage did not receive any playing time at this position in the major leagues.

In his MLB career of eight seasons, Cubbage appeared in 703 games, batting .258 with 34 home runs and 251 RBIs.

Coaching and managerial career
Cubbage managed the Mets' AA affiliate Jackson Mets for the 1986 season, taking them to their league playoff finals.

Cubbage then served as  Mets' third base coach in the late 1980s and early 1990s, and was named interim manager in September 1991. He managed the Mets in seven games, finishing with a career managerial record of three wins and four losses (.429).

During spring training in 2002, Cubbage served as the interim manager of the Boston Red Sox after previous manager Joe Kerrigan was fired. Cubbage remained on the staff as third base coach after the Red Sox hired Grady Little as Kerrigan's full-time replacement.

See also
 List of Major League Baseball players to hit for the cycle

References

External links
, or Retrosheet

1950 births
Living people
Baseball players from Virginia
Boston Red Sox coaches
Burlington Rangers players
Cangrejeros de Santurce (baseball) players
Geneva Senators players
Houston Astros coaches
Liga de Béisbol Profesional Roberto Clemente infielders
Major League Baseball first base coaches
Major League Baseball hitting coaches
Major League Baseball third base coaches
Major League Baseball third basemen
Minnesota Twins players
New York Mets coaches
New York Mets managers
New York Mets players
Norfolk Tides managers
Sportspeople from Charlottesville, Virginia
Pittsfield Rangers players
Spokane Indians players
Tampa Bay Devil Rays scouts
Tampa Bay Rays scouts
Texas Rangers players
Tiburones de La Guaira players
American expatriate baseball players in Venezuela
Tidewater Tides players
Virginia Cavaliers baseball players
Virginia Cavaliers football players
Washington Nationals scouts